Ice hockey at the 2022 European Youth Olympic Winter Festival comprised two ice hockey tournaments in the under-17 competition class – a boys' tournament and a girls' tournament – during the Vuokatti 2022 edition of the European Youth Olympic Festival (EYOF). The boys' tournament was held from 13 to 17 December 2021 and, following the postponement of the event due to the COVID-19 pandemic, the girls' tournament was played from 21 to 25 March 2022. Both tournaments were played at the Kajaanin jäähalli in Kajaani, Finland. The girls' tournament marked the first time women's ice hockey was included in the programme of a European Youth Olympic Festival.

Medal summary

Medal table

Medalists

Boys' tournament

Played during 13 to 17 December 2021, the boys' ice hockey tournament was the first event contested as part of the EYOF Vuokatti 2022. The five participating teams played a single round-robin of ten games and ranking was determined by a standard point system: three points were awarded for a win, two points for an overtime win, one point for an overtime loss, and no points were awarded for a loss in regulation.

Hosts Finland were victorious in each of their four games, successfully sweeping the tournament and winning their third EYOF gold medal. Belarus took home silver after beating bronze medalists Russia by just one point in the points tally – the result of their overtime win over Russia in game four. Despite ranking second in goals scored, the Czech Republic took fourth place in the final rankings and Latvia rounded out the table in fifth place.

The Czech team featured the top three point scorers of the tournament: scoring leader Eduard Šalé, who scored 2 goals and 6 assists for 8 points; second ranked Šimon Slavíček, who scored 4 goals and 2 assists for 6 points; and third ranked Adam Dvořák, who scored 4 goals and an assist for 5 points. Four Finns tied for fourth in scoring with 2 goals and 3 assists for 5 points each: Jere Lassila, Lenni Hämeenaho, Aleksanteri Kaskimäki, and Oskari Vuorio. The goal scoring table was topped by a three-player tie between the Czech Republic's Slavíček and Dvořák and Nikolai Tishkevich of Belarus, all of whom tallied 4 goals apiece.

The leading scorer of those teams not represented in the top-five on the points table were: Nikolai Tishkevich (4+0) for Belarus, Artem Duda (0+4) for Russia, and Emīls Veckaktiņš (2+1) for Latvia.

Final standings

Games
All times are local (UTC+2).

Girls' tournament

The girls' tournament was played in two stages, a preliminary round followed by the finals, a different format than was used for the boys' single pool tournament. In the preliminary round, the six participating teams were separated into two groups of three and played a single round-robin of three games per group. Ranking from the preliminary round established placement for the finals.

The Czech Republic and Sweden, winners of Group A and B respectively, faced off in the gold medal game. After sixty minutes of play, the match was tied 1–1, with a Czech goal from Adéla Šapovalivová and the Swedish goal from Olivia Sohrner. The tie was maintained through an overtime period and held steady until the fourth round of the shootout, when the Czech Republic's Zikmunda Mazancová scored what would stand as the only goal registered by any of the ten shooters and the Czechs won the inaugural gold medal in girls' ice hockey at a European Youth Olympic Winter Festival.

Finland claimed victory over Switzerland with a 5–1 score in the bronze medal game and Slovakia held Hungary scoreless to take fifth place.

The girls' ice hockey tournament was the third-most viewed event of the EYOF Vuokatti 2022 in terms of streaming, with 13,624 viewers.

Preliminary round

Group A

Group B

Final round

Fifth place game

Bronze medal game

Final

Final standings

Player statistics

Scoring leaders
List shows the top skaters sorted by points, then goals.

GP = Games played; G = Goals; A = Assists; Pts = Points; +/− = Plus/minus; PIM = Penalties in minutes; POS = Position
Source: Finnish Ice Hockey Association

Leading goaltenders
Only the top five goaltenders, based on save percentage, who have played at least one third of their team's minutes, are included in this list.

TOI = Time on ice (minutes:seconds); SA = Shots against; GA = Goals against; GAA = Goals against average; Sv% = Save percentage; SO = Shutouts
Source: Finnish Ice Hockey Association

References

2022 European Youth Olympic Winter Festival events
European Youth Olympic Winter Festival
2022
2022